is a 2015 third-person shooter video game developed and published by Nintendo for the Wii U. The game centers around Inklings—anthropomorphic cephalopodic lifeforms that can transform between humanoid and cephalopod forms and frequently engage in turf wars with each other and use a variety of weapons that produce and shoot colored ink while in humanoid form, or swim and hide in surfaces covered in their own colored ink while in their cephalopodic forms. Splatoon features several different game modes, including four-on-four online multiplayer and a single player campaign.

Splatoon was developed by Nintendo's Entertainment Analysis & Development division, and originated from a competitive multiplayer ink-based territory control game, which was later expanded to include squid and the ability to swim through ink. The concept was created by lead programmer Shintaro Sato, who had previously worked on games in the Animal Crossing franchise. The development team for Splatoon was generally composed of younger Nintendo employees compared to other games by the company.

Splatoon received positive reviews, with critics praising Nintendo's decision to enter the genre with a new franchise, the game's overall style and presentation, gameplay mechanics, and its soundtrack. However, criticism was directed at the exclusion of voice chat and private lobbies, the small number of multiplayer maps at launch, and issues with online matchmaking. Nintendo provided post-release support for the game by adding new maps and weapons to the game, adding a feature to allow users to create private lobbies and holding time-limited events called "Splatfests". Splatoon was awarded and nominated for several year-end accolades from several gaming publications. A sequel, Splatoon 2, was released for the Nintendo Switch on July 21, 2017, followed by another sequel, Splatoon 3, which was released on the Nintendo Switch on September 9, 2022.

Gameplay 

Splatoon is primarily a team-based third-person shooter that is playable by up to eight players in online four-versus-four matches, although the game also features local one-versus-one multiplayer matches and a single player campaign. Players control an Inkling, who have the ability to transform between humanoid and squid forms. In humanoid form, Inklings can shoot ink in their team's color, which can be used to cover the environment or "splat" opposing players or enemies. Transforming into a squid allows players to swim through the ink of their own color, even up walls and through grates, hiding from the enemy and replenishing their ink supply in the process. Conversely, enemy ink is much slower to walk across in humanoid form, cannot be swum through in squid form, and gradually deals damage. Players can use their ink to try and "splat" their opponents, which will send them back to their team's starting point whilst also providing a large splat of ink. In all modes, except for the two-player mode, players can use the Wii U GamePad to view a map of the surroundings and instantly launch towards the location of another teammate, as well as use optional gyroscopic controls to assist with aiming.

Players go into matches wielding a primary ink weapon, each with differing statistics and traits, along with a secondary weapon (such as ink-filled balloons, sprinklers, and disruptive fields), and a special attack that can be charged up by covering enough ground with ink. Primary paint weapons range from those whose firing patterns resemble various types of firearms, to melee weapons such as Splat Rollers, Inkbrushes, and Sloshers (ink buckets). Ink weapons are sold in sets that can be purchased with money earned from matches, with more sets becoming available to the player as they gain experience. In addition, players can customize their character with headgear, clothes, and shoes from the neighboring shops, with more items becoming available as the player's level increases. Each item carries an ability that improves the player's statistics, such as faster respawn time or longer special duration. Additional abilities can be unlocked by gaining experience in battles. When encountering other players in the plaza, players can choose to order an item another player is wearing and purchase it the next day from the back alley dealer named Spyke for a higher price.

The game also supports Splatoon Amiibo figures, with each figure unlocking a set of missions which unlocks extra equipment (weapons and clothing) and a bonus minigame upon completion, the latter of which can be selected and played on the Wii U GamePad while waiting in lobbies. Players can also make posts to the game's Miiverse community, which appear in-game as graffiti on various buildings.

Multiplayer 
Online multiplayer is split into regular (turf war) and ranked game types. Each of these match types goes through a rotation of two maps, which change every four hours. In ranked games, players gain or drop ranks based on consecutive wins and losses, ranging from C− to S+. Having a higher rank increases the amount of money and experience earned after wins.

There are four modes (rule-sets) used for online matches, all of which need two teams consisting of a maximum of four players each. Turf War is the only mode for regular matches. Ranked matches change between Splat Zones, Tower Control, and Rainmaker.

 Turf War: Each team tries to ink the most turf as possible in their own color of ink within three minutes. The team that covers the most turf in their color ink when time runs out wins.
 Splat Zones (a king of the hill-style mode): Each team tries to control designated areas by keeping them covered in their ink; the team that achieves this get their counter value decreased at a constant rate. The team that has the lowest value on their counter wins.
 Tower Control: Each team tries to board the floating tower located at the center of the map. When a player boards the tower, it moves towards a target located at the end of the opponents' side of the map along a predetermined path. The team that had moved the tower closest to the opponents' side's target wins.
 Rainmaker (a capture the flag-style mode): Players on each team try to pickup the Rainmaker and carry it towards a target on the opponents' side of the map. Once the Rainmaker is picked up by a player, that player can drop the rainmaker only by getting splatted (killed) or going out-of-bounds. The Rainmaker can also be used as a weapon and does not use any ink. The team that had carried the Rainmaker closest to the opponents' side's target wins.

In Battle Dojo, the local multiplayer mode, two players compete to pop the most balloons, with one player using the Wii U GamePad and the other using the TV with a Wii U Pro Controller or Wii Classic Controller or either controller in conjunction with a MotionPlus-enabled Wii Remote to recreate the GamePad's gyroscopic controls.

Time-limited "Splatfest" events, held between June 2015 and July 2016, were also held in multiplayer play. During these events, players could choose between one of two teams, and earn points towards a player rank and their team based on their performance. Members of the winning team, decided by popularity and overall performance, earned Super Sea Snails, which could be used to re-spec and add additional perks to equipment, with the losing team earning fewer snails. Following the final Splatfest event, which ended on 24 July 2016, Super Sea Snails can be earned by winning a certain number of matches.

Campaign 
Octo Valley is the game's single player campaign in which players are recruited by war veteran Cap'n Cuttlefish to rescue the Great Zapfish, Inkopolis' source of power, from the Octarians, a race of octopuses with whom the Inklings warred in a century-old territorial conflict known as the Great Turf War. Players use a default ink weapon for this mode, which can be enhanced with upgrades or power-ups by collecting Power Eggs littered across the campaign's levels. The goal of each level is to navigate through enemies and obstacles to reach the Zapfish at the end. Each level also contains a hidden "sunken scroll" which reveals backstories and lore surrounding the setting of Splatoon. After clearing all of the levels in an area, players fight a boss called an Octoweapon to proceed to the next. Clearing each boss unlocks blueprints that can be exchanged at an armoury for more weapon options.

Development 
Splatoon was developed by Nintendo Entertainment Analysis & Development. In mid-2013, one member of the Animal Crossing development team, Shintaro Sato, created a four-versus-four ink-based territory control game set in a featureless arena. After management approved making the prototype into a full game, the team started expanding its concepts, creating the ability to hide in ink, and wanted to somehow incorporate squids. After coming up with these ideas, the developers had trouble "filter[ing] it down" to a "simple, fun game." Shigeru Miyamoto told the team that there was "no appeal" to the game in that state. Afterwards, the developers added the ability to hide in ink and verticality to the maps, but it still felt unfocused. The art director sketched different ideas for the player character, including animals, "macho men," robots, and Mario, but the co-directors wanted to include a playable squid. They also needed the character to be human in order to hold weaponry, but thought that a squid-human hybrid "wouldn't sell". In January 2014, they realized they could make the player character switch between human and squid forms, which allowed them to come up with other ideas, such as swimming through ink or sustaining damage while maneuvering in enemy ink, which Miyamoto approved of. From the beginning, the GamePad could display a real-time overview of the map so the player could see which team was ahead, and at some point, the team considered using urinals and sinks as warp points. The development team was determined to make interesting sound effects, so they repeatedly pounded slime to create the sound of a squid diving into ink.

The team working on the game is composed of much younger members compared to other teams that work on Nintendo franchises. Game director Tsubasa Sakaguchi and producer Hisashi Nogami admitted that they, along with the rest of the team, play first person shooters and games on other companies' hardware (such as Call of Duty and Battlefield) as part of their job, and also because they love video games in general. Monolith Soft also assisted Nintendo on the development of the game. Splatoon was revealed in a trailer during Nintendo's E3 2014 Digital Event video presentation, and a demo of its multiplayer mode was playable on the show floor. The game's single-player campaign was further detailed in a later Nintendo Direct.

Release 

Prior to the game's release, a time-limited multiplayer demo known as the "Global Testfire" was held on 8 and 9 May 2015 and one two-hour block on 23 May 2015. On 15 May, on the Santa Monica Pier in Santa Monica, California, Nintendo held a special event called the Splatoon Mess Fest, featuring celebrities and an obstacle course inspired by the game. Fans could also play a demo of the game at the event. A collaboration with Masahiro Anbe's Squid Girl manga series was announced, which included free in-game costumes released on 6 August 2015. Splatoon outfits are also featured in the Nintendo 3DS title, Girls Mode 3: Kirakira ☆ Code. In Canada, Splatoon-themed frozen yogurt was produced at various Yogurty's locations from June to September. Nintendo UK partnered with Adrenaline Alley skatepark to decorate it with decals and props based on the game and install several Wii U demo stations for the summer. Nintendo also held fan-art competitions on Miiverse and Twitter.

Wii U Deluxe Set bundles with Splatoon included were released in North America at Best Buy stores (as a coupon for a digital copy) Australia, Europe, and New Zealand (on a physical disc). Splatoon series Amiibo were released alongside the game, with Boy and Girl Inklings sold separately and a Squid figure sold exclusively as a bundle with either the game or the two other Amiibo. Amiibo figures of in-game pop idols Callie and Marie—collectively known as the "Squid Sisters"—were released in Japan on 7 July 2016 and internationally on 8 July 2016, along with limited edition recolors of the Inkling Boy, Girl and Squid Amiibo; the Callie and Marie Amiibo unlock in-game music players featuring their songs. Players who pre-ordered the game at GameStop received a download voucher for Splatoon-themed Mii costumes for use in Super Smash Bros. for Nintendo 3DS and Wii U. A bundle containing Splatoon and Super Smash Bros. for Nintendo 3DS and Wii U was announced in a November 2015 Nintendo Direct and was released during the holiday season. Nintendo released a Splatoon Wii U Deluxe Set containing the amiibo figures in Japan on 7 July 2016. In addition, Nintendo launched two new diorama sets based solely on Splatoon and its characters around the same time in Japan.

In the United Kingdom, a lorry containing a shipment of special edition copies of the game was hijacked in transit, resulting in GAME having to cancel all their special edition pre-orders.

Additional modes, along with new maps and weapons, have been introduced to the game through timed updates. An August 2015 update raised the level cap from 20 to 50, added S and S+ ranks to ranked battles, introduced new Splatling and Slosher weapons, private lobbies and party play, and added over 40 new pieces of gear items. In July 2016, Nintendo announced that the United Kingdom would host a splat-off between 16 July through 7 August 2016.

In December 2015, it was announced that free downloadable content would conclude in January 2016, although Nintendo later announced that downloadable content will continue to be released. Additionally, Nintendo announced that Splatoons online services will continue to be active, despite the game's final Splatfest having occurred on 22 July 2016.

Reception 

Splatoon was well-received when it was revealed. Many in the gaming press were surprised that Nintendo was creating a shooter intellectual property and praised the new gameplay ideas that distinguished it from other titles in the genre.

On release, Splatoon received positive reviews, receiving an aggregated score of 81/100 on Metacritic based on 88 reviews. GamesRadar gave the game 3.5/5 stars, praising the game's refreshing take on the shooter genre, while criticising some elements such as lobbies and amiibo-locked content. GameTrailers gave the game a score of 8.4/10, praising the game's mechanics and presentation, while lamenting that the game felt sparse at launch. IGN initially scored the game 7.9, praising the gameplay but criticizing the low number of maps and modes at launch and absence of voice chat. After several major updates were released, IGN released a re-review, increasing the game's score to 8.6/10 because of the new maps and online modes. Some critics expressed displeasure over the fact that communication errors cause a loss of points in Ranked Battles. Destructoid gave the game a score of 8.5, arguing that its shortcomings "can be forgiven in [his] mind because of how damn fun it is." Nintendo Life scored the game nine stars out of ten, considering Splatoon one of the "most fun" online games available because of the unique way each online match played out due to the ink mechanic, which also helped counteract potential boredom from the low number of maps playable at launch.

Writing for The Guardian, Kate Gray praised the visual style of Splatoon for contrasting realistic shooter games such as the Call of Duty franchise with a "90s cartoon aesthetic", citing influence by games such as Jet Set Radio, Super Mario Sunshine, and de Blob, along with a catchy soundtrack. However, Gray noted shortcomings in the game, such as a lack of multiplayer maps and modes on-launch making the game feel repetitive, matchmaking issues (such as inconsistent wait times between matches and team composition issues), as well as the lack of features such as voice chat and private lobbies, but defending the criticism by arguing that it was "[Nintendo's] first game in a long time that's really attempted to revitalize and reinvent a genre that often seems stagnant. This sort of daring creative venture will have its flaws, and if anything, we should be glad that it’s Nintendo taking the first step into new territory." Gray concluded by declaring Splatoon to be "a breath of fresh air—or more accurately 'splodge of fresh ink'—for those who like to shoot stuff, but have grown tired of the endless bloody churn of gritty, realistic shooters."

Sales 
Splatoon debuted at No. 2 in the UK software sales chart in the week it launched, only behind The Witcher 3: Wild Hunt. It is the fifth fastest-selling Wii U game and the fastest-selling new intellectual property on the console in that country, beating the previous record set by Ubisoft's 2012 launch title ZombiU. Splatoon debuted at the top of the Japanese software sales chart, with over 144,000 retail copies sold in its launch week and a total of 1.53 million sold by December 2016. In the U.S., 165,000 combined physical and downloaded copies were sold in May 2015, with another 290,000 sold in June and 85,000 in July. By the end of August 2015, over 600,000 copies had been sold in the region. In March 2016, Nintendo announced that one million copies had been shipped in Europe. By the end of June 2015, 1.62 million copies of the game had been sold worldwide, and by the end of March 2021, worldwide sales reached 4.95 million. In May 2016, Splatoon was announced to be the most successful new home console intellectual property (IP) in Japan since Wii Sports. The game's soundtrack album debuted at number two on Billboard Japan's Hot Albums chart and was number 46 on the chart's 2015 year-end list.

Awards

Media 

An artbook for the game titled the Art of Splatoon was released in Japan in September 2015, and in North America and Europe in June 2017. Toy water guns modeled after an in-game weapon were released by Jakks Pacific in 2017.

In 2016, a series of real-life virtual concerts featuring the Squid Sisters, known as "Squid Sisters Live" and appearing as holograms, were held at Tokaigi 2016 (Makuhari Messe) in January, Choukagi 2016 in April, Japan Expo (Paris) in July, and Niconico Cho Party in November.

Splatoon has been adapted into a manga series, which is written and illustrated by Sankichi Hinodeya. It began serialization in Bessatsu CoroCoro Comic in February 2016, and launched in CoroCoro Comic on 15 May 2017. It has also been published in English by Viz Media. CoroCoro Comic gave free access to the entire series for a limited time from 22 June – 13 July 2018.

Notes

References

External links 
 
 
 

Splatoon
2015 video games
Multiplayer and single-player video games
Nintendo Entertainment Analysis and Development games
Nintendo games
Nintendo Network games
Third-person shooters
Video games developed in Japan
Video games featuring protagonists of selectable gender
Video games scored by Toru Minegishi
Video games that use Amiibo figurines
Video games with downloadable content
Wii U eShop games
Wii U games
Wii U-only games
Post-apocalyptic video games
Japan Game Awards' Game of the Year winners
The Game Awards winners